Always a Bride is a 1940 comedy film directed by Noel M. Smith and starring Rosemary Lane and George Reeves.

Plot summary

Wealthy Alice Bond (Rosemary Lane), dissatisfied with her dishwater-dull fiancé Marshall Winkler (John Eldridge), throws him over in favor of Michael Stevens (George Reeves). To make certain that her new beau will be acceptable to her parents, Alice contrives to have Michael enter a mayoral campaign. As election day draws close, criminals complicate matters.

Cast
 Rosemary Lane as Alice Bond
 George Reeves as Michael 'Mike' Stevens
 John Eldredge as Marshall Winkler
 James Hayter as Dutton
 Virginia Brissac as Lucy Bond
 Francis Pierlot as Pete Bond
 Oscar O'Shea as Uncle Dan Jarvis
 Ferris Taylor as Mayor Paul Loomis
 Joe King as Mr. Franklyn (as Joseph King)
 Phyllis Ruth as Mary Ann Coleridge
 Lucia Carroll as Mayor's Receptionist
 Jack Mower as Martin, First Man Yelling Out at Meeting
 Tom Wilson as Charlie, Dance Party Guest

References

External links 
 
 
 
 

Noel M. Smith

1940 films
American black-and-white films
American films based on plays
1940 romantic comedy films
American romantic comedy films
Warner Bros. films
Films directed by Noel M. Smith
1940s English-language films
1940s American films